Eggheads is a British quiz show produced by 12 Yard. It was first broadcast in November 2003 chaired by Dermot Murnaghan. In 2008, Jeremy Vine became joint chair, and subsequently sole chair. The show has inspired three spinoff series: Are You an Egghead? (2008), Revenge of the Egghead (2014) and Make Me an Egghead (2016). There have also been episodes of the regular series featuring teams of celebrities in their own short series, with their own rolling prize fund.

History
The show began in 2003 with Dermot Murnaghan as the presenter. From 2008, Jeremy Vine presented when Murnaghan was hosting the spinoff series. After the spin-off show finished, Murnaghan and Vine continued to host the series on a rotational basis, with Murnaghan typically hosting the first half of each series and Vine taking over for the second half. From series 16 Vine became the sole presenter.

The series originally broadcast on BBC One at lunchtime beginning in November 2003, and later moved to a primetime slot on BBC Two from 2005 to 2020.

On 31 December 2016 the quiz made a brief cameo in BBC One’s Peter Pan Goes Wrong TV special.

On 12 March 2021, after a year's hiatus during the COVID-19 pandemic, it was announced on Jeremy Vine's titular Channel 5 programme that the quiz show would be moving to Channel 5 with Vine and the most recent Eggheads returning. The new series premiered on 4 October 2021, and alongside a studio change, only four Eggheads and four contestants now played at a time with a reduction to three one-on-one rounds to accommodate advert breaks (due to Channel 5's status as a commercial broadcaster). Due to social distancing restrictions, the desks were lengthened and perspex screens were added. The first challengers, playing for charity, were Jay's Virtual Quiz, who had become a fundraising hit on social media during the pandemic. An additional Egghead was featured on the opening credits and competed from week two.

Format
In each episode, a team of five quiz and game show champions (the Eggheads) is challenged by a team of five contestants for prize money. If the challengers lose, then £1,000 is added to the prize money fund until the Eggheads are beaten, when the prize will revert to £1,000. The most prize money that has been won is £75,000, in 2007.

Some teams have been reduced to one contestant for the final round, but have still beaten five Eggheads. Occasionally, one remaining Egghead will beat five challengers. Only once have the Eggheads lost four games in succession and only four times has a team of all five challengers won the final round. Since 2021, it has been four Eggheads against four challengers, instead of the previous five.

Rounds
The show is played in five rounds. The first four 'one-on-one' 'elimination' rounds each focus on one subject category (of nine) while the final 'conferring' round tests general knowledge. In the first four rounds, the challengers choose a member of their own team to play, and an Egghead against whom they wish to compete. The players for that round then leave the studio to go into the "Question Room". The challenger is given the choice of going first or second. Both players are asked in turn three multiple-choice questions. If there is no winner, the round goes into sudden death with no choices given for answers. Since the show moved to Channel 5, there have only been four players per team, and thus only three 'one-on-one' rounds.

The player who wins each round earns a place in the final round, while losing players are eliminated from the game.

The final general knowledge round is then played between non-eliminated Eggheads and challengers with a similar question format to the previous rounds, with the exception that if more than one remains on a team they may confer. If the challengers win they take the prize money; if the Eggheads win, the prize money is increased by £1,000 for the next quiz.

Subjects
There are nine (formerly eight) possible subjects for the first rounds. They are:
Arts & Books (2003–present)
Entertainment (2003–2008)
Film & Television (2008–present)
Food & Drink (2003–present)
Geography (2003–present)
History (2003–present)
Music (2008–present)
Politics (2003–present)
Science (2003–present)
Sport (2003–present)
Music and Film & Television were introduced in Autumn 2008 through a split of the Entertainment category. Subjects can appear in any order, although at least one of Sport, Music or Film & Television will appear in every episode. Despite the splitting of the Entertainment category, Music and Film & Television can appear in the same episode, sometimes consecutively.

"Eggheads"
In the first eight series, the team consisted of only five Eggheads who each appeared in every episode and did not rotate. At the end of 2008, a sixth Egghead was added and appearances rotated. From series 15, five of eight possible Eggheads appear each episode, and later in 2016, two brand-new Eggheads (one male and one female) joined the panel after a spin-off series entitled Make Me an Egghead. Currently, there are 8 Eggheads (6 male and 2 female): Kevin Ashman, Chris Hughes, Barry Simmons, Pat Gibson, Steve Cooke, Olav Bjortomt, Lisa Thiel and Beth Webster and they currently appear on Channel 5.

Current Eggheads

Kevin Ashman (2003–present) is the eight-time winner of the British Quiz Championship, the winner of the third series of Fifteen to One in 1989, the 1995 Mastermind (including all-time record score), the 1996 Brain of Britain (including all-time record score), its 3-yearly Brain of Brains and 9-yearly Top Brain in 1998, the Fifteen to One: Millenium Edition in 1999, the thirteen time Brain of London winner, the twice Gold Medallist for quizzing at the Mind Sports Olympiad, the two time Master Brain, and the winner of Sale of the Century, Quiz Night, Trivial Pursuit and The Great British Quiz. Since joining Eggheads, he has won six European Quizzing Championships and six World Quizzing Championships as well as being the Captain of the England quiz team and being ranked the number one quizzer in the world.
Chris Hughes (2003–present) won £100 on The Sky's the Limit in the 1970s, Top of the World in 1982, Mastermind and International Mastermind in 1983 and participated on The Weakest Link in 2001 where despite answering every question correctly, was the last contestant voted off. Since joining Eggheads, he won Brain of Britain in 2005.
Barry Simmons (2008–present) won £64,000 on Who Wants to Be a Millionaire? in 2005, a winning member of Masterteam in 2006 and a semi-finalist on Mastermind. He joined Eggheads in 2008 after winning the first series of Are You an Egghead? beating in the final Shaun Wallace, who would become one of two original chasers in The Chase. Since joining Eggheads, he won Brain of Britain in 2013 which garnered controversy amongst listeners. He is currently a member of the Scotland Quiz Team.
Pat Gibson (2009–present) was the fourth British winner of £1,000,000 on Who Wants to Be a Millionaire?, and the fifth recorded contestant to do so, in 2004, Mastermind in 2005 and Brain of Britain in 2006. He is a four-time winner (2007, 2010, 2014, 2015) of the British Quiz Championship, and a four-time winner (2007, 2010, 2011, 2013) of the World Quizzing Championships. He took part in Are You an Egghead? twice, losing in the quarter-finals to Mark Kerr in the first series in 2008, but winning the second series in 2009 beating David Edwards in the final to join the Eggheads. He also won Mastermind Champion of Champions in 2010. He has amassed 21 international quizzing medals and was ranked the second strongest quizzer in the UK, behind Kevin Ashman.
Lisa Thiel (2014–present), a previous contestant on The Weakest Link in 2001 where she made the final but lost, The Chase in 2012 and part of a winning team on the Egghead's spinoff Revenge of the Egghead in 2014.
Steve Cooke (2016–present), winner of the men's contest in Make Me an Egghead. He is a member of Mensa who previously won £12,900 on The People Versus in 2001.
Beth Webster (2016–present), winner of the women's contest in Make Me an Egghead. She is active on the Quizzing Grand Prix Circuit in the United Kingdom, and in The Quiz League of London. She was ranked as a "Sage" in the 2012 Order of Merit listings of the British Quiz Association.
Olav Bjortomt (2021–present), the four-time winner of the World Quizzing Championships, and a four-time European Quiz Champion. He is also a question setter for University Challenge and The Chase and has previously been a contestant on Are You an Egghead?

Former Eggheads
CJ de Mooi (2003–2012, Revenge of the Egghead (2014), 2014–2016) won the original The Weakest Link Bad Loser Special in 2000,100% in 2001, Beat the Nation in 2002 and Fifteen to One. He is also a Mensa chess champion. He took a break from the show from August 2012 until May 2014. His last appearance on his first run on the show was on 31 August 2012 during Series 13. He was the sole Egghead on Revenge of the Egghead, which aired on BBC Two in 2014. In May 2016, he confirmed on Twitter that he was leaving the show again to pursue an acting career in South Africa.
Daphne Fowler (2003–2014) won Going for Gold in 1988, Brain of Britain in 1997 and two series of Fifteen to One in 2001 (including second highest score, for which she answered every question in the final round correctly). She has now retired from Eggheads, with her last appearance being in May 2014. She was replaced in the team by returning Egghead CJ de Mooi.
Dave Rainford (2012–2018) appeared on Remote Control in 1991 and won £250,000 on Who Wants To Be A Millionaire in 2005. He was a previous contestant on Are You An Egghead where he was a semi-finalist in the first series in 2008, losing to eventual winner Barry Simmons, and a quarter-finalist in the second series in 2009, losing to David Edwards. He replaced CJ de Mooi. He earned himself the nickname "Tremendous Knowledge Dave". On 7 March 2020, it was reported that Rainford had died, after illness had prevented him appearing on the show since 2018.
Judith Keppel (2003–2022) was the first British winner of £1,000,000 on Who Wants to Be a Millionaire? in 2000. On 10 October 2022, Judith announced her retirement from the show.

Graphical representation
This chart displays when each presenter and Egghead was active. The black bars denote the start of each series.

Teams who have defeated the Eggheads
The highest amount any team has won to beat the Eggheads is £75,000 in 2007 (Series 8, Episode 14) by a team of Oxford Brookes University students, Beer Today, Gone Tomorrow.

Transmissions

Regular editions

Celebrity editions

Spin-offs

Are You an Egghead?

On 20 October 2008, a spin-off called Are You an Egghead? debuted on BBC Two. The first series was won by Barry Simmons and ran from 20 October to 2 December 2008 while the second series was won by Pat Gibson and ran from 12 October to 23 November 2009.

Revenge of the Egghead
On 24 February 2014, a new spin-off series of Eggheads was launched called Revenge of the Egghead. It was presented by Jeremy Vine and saw the return of CJ de Mooi, who left Eggheads in 2012. In each episode, de Mooi faced a team of five contestants hoping to win thousands of pounds. The series ran for a 6-week period, between 24 February and 4 April 2014. Lisa Thiel appeared on the show as part of a winning team before becoming an Egghead herself shortly afterwards.

Main game
Each contestant, in turn, is asked a general knowledge question. If their answer is right, £200 is added to the prize fund but if their answer is wrong and de Mooi knows their answer is wrong, he presses a red button in front of him to answer the same question. If he gets it wrong and the contestant gets it right, an additional £100 is added to the prize fund. If he gets it right, the contestant is asked a multiple-choice question by de Mooi. If they get it right, gameplay continues as normal but if they get it wrong, they lose one of their two lives. If a contestant loses both of their lives, they are out of the game. When time runs out, the surviving players move on to the final round, along with the total number of lives remaining for all players, for a chance to win an equal share of the prize fund.

Final round
The final round starts out with de Mooi answering ten general knowledge questions. The number of questions he gets right becomes the target that the team has to beat. The team can confer on every question. Every wrong answer means that the team loses one of their lives and if they lose all of their lives, they leave with nothing but if they beat the target, they win an equal share of the prize fund.

Make Me an Egghead

A 25-part spin-off series ran from 22 August to 23 September 2016, with the search for two new members for the Eggheads line-up: one male, one female. The series was won by Steve Cooke and Beth Webster.

References

External links

Eggheads at 12-Yard Productions

Celebrity Eggheads

2003 British television series debuts
2000s British game shows
2010s British game shows
2020s British game shows
BBC Scotland television shows
Channel 5 (British TV channel) original programming
BBC television game shows
English-language television shows
Television series by ITV Studios
Television game shows with incorrect disambiguation